The 2019 CAF Confederation Cup Final was the final of the 2018–19 CAF Confederation Cup, the 28th edition of Africa's secondary club football tournament organized by the Confederation of African Football (CAF), and the 16th edition under the current CAF Confederation Cup title.

The final was contested in two-legged home-and-away format between RS Berkane from Morocco and Zamalek from Egypt. The first leg was hosted by RS Berkane at the Stade Municipal de Berkane in Berkane on 19 May 2019, while the second leg was hosted by Zamalek at the Borg El Arab Stadium in Alexandria on 26 May 2019.

The final finished 1–1 on aggregate, with Zamalek winning 5–3 on penalties for their first CAF Confederation Cup title. The winner will earn the right to play in the 2020 CAF Super Cup.

Teams

Venues

Road to the final

Note: In all results below, the score of the finalist is given first (H: home; A: away).

Format
The final will be played on a home-and-away two-legged basis, with the order of legs determined by the knockout stage draw, which was held on 20 March 2019, 19:00 CAT (UTC+2), at the Marriot Hotel in Cairo, Egypt.

If the aggregate score is tied after the second leg, the away goals rule will be applied, and if still tied, extra time won't be played, and the penalty shoot-out will be used to determine the winner.

Matches

First leg

Second leg

See also
2019 CAF Champions League Final
2020 CAF Super Cup

References

External links
Total Confederation Cup 2018/2019, CAFonline.com

2018-19
Final
May 2019 sports events in Africa
Zamalek SC matches
RS Berkane matches
2018–19 in Moroccan football
2018–19 in Egyptian football
Sports competitions in Cairo
2010s in Cairo
International club association football competitions hosted by Morocco
International club association football competitions hosted by Egypt
Association football penalty shoot-outs